Johann Eigenstiller (born 17 June 1943) is a former Austrian football defender who played for Austria. He also played for SK Vorwärts Steyr, FC Wacker and SK Rapid Wien.

External links
 
 

1943 births
Austrian footballers
Austria international footballers
Association football defenders
SK Vorwärts Steyr players
FC Wacker Innsbruck players
SK Rapid Wien players
FC Wacker Innsbruck managers
Living people
Austrian football managers